William Denny and Brothers Limited, often referred to simply as Denny, was a Scottish shipbuilding company.

History

The shipbuilding interests of the Denny family date back to William Denny (born 1779), for whom ships are recorded being built in Dumbarton as far back as 1811 such as the sailing sloop Alpha.) By 1823 the company name had changed to William Denny & Son. The first ship it built under this name was the paddle steamer Superb. From 1845 the company became Denny Brothers (this being William jnr, Alexander and Peter), and in 1849 the firm was reconstituted as William Denny & Brothers, this being William, James and Peter Denny.

Although the Denny yard was situated near the junction of the River Clyde and the River Leven, the yard was on the Leven. The founder developed the company's interests in ship owning and operation with interests in the British & Burmese Steam Navigation Company, the Irrawaddy Flotilla Company and La Platense Flotilla.

The Company built all types of ships but were particularly well known as producers of fine cross-channel steamships and ferries. It was a pioneer in the development of the ship's stabiliser in conjunction with Edinburgh-based Brown Brothers & Company. In 1913 the Channel steamer Paris was one of the first ships to use geared turbine engines utilising new Michell tilting-pad fluid bearing. It also undertook experimental work in hovercraft and helicopter-type aircraft.

A marine engineering company, also based in Dumbarton, was formed by Peter Denny, John Tulloch and John McAusland in 1850 as Tulloch & Denny. In 1862 the company was renamed Denny & Co. The company manufactured a wide range of types of marine engines and was absorbed into William Denny & Brothers in 1918.

Dennys were always innovators and were one of the first commercial shipyards in the world to have their own experimental testing tank: this is now open to the public as a museum. William Denny & Company went into voluntary liquidation in 1963.

Denny ship model experiment tank
Inspired by the work of eminent naval architect William Froude, Denny's completed the world's first commercial example of a ship testing tank in 1883. The facility was used to test models of various ships and explored various propulsion methods, including propellers, paddles and vane wheels. Experiments were carried out on models of the Denny-Brown stabiliser and the Denny hovercraft to gauge their feasibility. Tank staff also carried out research and experiments for other companies: Belfast-based Harland and Wolff decided to fit a bulbous bow on the liner  after successful model tests in the Denny Tank. After the Denny yard closed, the test tank facility was taken over by Vickers Shipbuilding and Engineering Limited and used for the testing of submarines until the early 1980s.

Re-opened as part of the Scottish Maritime Museum in 1982, it retains many of its original features, including the 100m long ship testing tank. The towing carriage is still in working order and is demonstrated from time to time, but all instrumentation has been removed and so the tank cannot currently be used for hydrodynamic research and testing.

Denny-built vessels
Some significant Denny-built vessels include:
 SS Margery (1814) for James McCubbin, first steamship on east coast, first on Thames  and first to cross the English Channel
 SS Greenock (1815) for James McCubbin, first steamship in Belfast and first on River Mersey
 Cutty Sark (1869); completed by Denny's after the liquidation of her contracted builders, Scott & Linton; preserved in a dry dock at Greenwich, London
  (1892); a Lake Titicaca steamer and now a floating restaurant
  (1899); excursion steamer on Loch Katrine, Scotland
  (1901); excursion steamer and the first commercial ship powered by steam turbines
 ; an ocean liner built for the Cunard Line. Existed under multiple roles and ownerships for over 80 years before finally being scrapped in Japan.
  (1893) A cross-channel ferry which sank in 1895 after collision with another LBSCR vessel, the cargo ship Lyon.
  (1896) A cross-channel ferry, built as an almost exact replacement for SS Seaford. It was severely damaged by a torpedo from a German U-boat in 1916. At least 50 passengers died.
  A cross-channel ferry which was involved in a collision with the windjammer Preußen 8 nautical miles (15 km) south of Newhaven, resulting in its total loss.   
; a refrigerated cargo liner that was the first commercial ship to be powered by a combination of reciprocating steam engines and a low-pressure steam turbine
; a cross-channel packet boat that was converted into a seaplane tender in 1914, sold to Filipino owners in 1933 and sunk by a mine in 1941
 Delta King (1924–26); currently a hotel, theatre, and restaurant in Sacramento, California
 Delta Queen (1924–26); currently a hotel at Chattanooga, Tennessee
  (1933); A Clyde turbine steamer that was once a floating restaurant in London. Now undergoing restoration next to the Glasgow Science Centre.
; a Clyde paddle steamer that was converted into a minesweeper in 1939, a pub and restaurant in 1969 and was destroyed by fire in 1980
  (1937); built for the Southern Railway, and the World's last coal-fired sea-going paddle steamer when withdrawn from service in 1969. Undergoing preservation at the Island Harbour Marina on the Isle of Wight.
  (1938); a former Denny-owned tug and tender on the Clyde
  (1938); an Isle of Wight ferry that in 1974 became the Clyde ferry MV Sound of Sanda
  (1950); a former Mersey ferry berthed at Woolwich, London
MV Fenerbahçe (1953); a former passenger ferry, now a museum ship in Istanbul, Turkey
  (1957); Leopard class frigate, now  BNS Ali Haider in Bangladesh Navy
 Denny D2 Hoverbus; an early attempt to build a hovercraft for use as a passenger vehicle
  (1961) Last vessel built by William Denny and Brothers. She was a Roll-on/roll-off Road/Rail ferry built for New Zealand Railways Department.

Company flag
The company's flag consisted of a blue elephant against a white field. This image was taken from the civic arms of Dumbarton, and it also served to symbolise the strength and solidity of the company's products.

See also
Scottish Maritime Museum

References

External links
 – database of all ships built in Scotland

 – photographs

Defunct shipbuilding companies of Scotland
Companies based in West Dunbartonshire
River Clyde
Manufacturing companies established in 1840
Manufacturing companies disestablished in 1963
British companies established in 1840
British companies disestablished in 1963
1840 establishments in Scotland
1963 disestablishments in Scotland
Defunct companies of Scotland
Dumbarton
British Shipbuilders